Courtney Ekmark (born April 8, 1995) is an American basketball player who played college basketball at Arizona State University. She played her first two collegiate seasons for the University of Connecticut.

By the time she became eligible to play for Arizona State in 2017, she had received a bachelor's degree from ASU and enrolled in the university's Sandra Day O'Connor College of Law, spending her entire ASU playing career as a law student. She received a J.D. degree in May 2020. At the end of her final season as a player in 2019, she received the Charles T. Stoner Law Scholarship Award from the Women's Basketball Coaches Association, presented annually to a women's college player who plans to pursue a legal career.

Prior to enrolling at UConn she played for St. Mary's High School in Phoenix. She was named Arizona's Gatorade Player of the Year. Ekmark also played tennis in high school.

Connecticut  statistics

Source

References

External links
 UConn player profile

1995 births
Living people
American women's basketball players
Arizona State Sun Devils women's basketball players
Basketball players from Phoenix, Arizona
Sandra Day O'Connor College of Law alumni
Shooting guards
Small forwards
UConn Huskies women's basketball players